Elysius intensus is a moth of the family Erebidae. It was described by Walter Rothschild in 1910. It is found in Brazil.

References

intensus
Moths described in 1910
Moths of South America